Alexandra Yurevna Skochilenko (born 13 September 1990), also known as Sasha Skochilenko, is a Russian artist and musician.

Biography
Skochilenko was born in Leningrad, Russian SFSR, Soviet Union (now Saint Petersburg, Russia). She is an alumna of the Smolny College of Liberal Arts and Sciences, Saint Petersburg State University. She is an author of the Book About Depression (2014), which helped destigmatize mental health issues in Russia. She is an open lesbian and her partner has been involved in publicizing the course of her criminal case and the conditions of her detention.

Russian invasion of Ukraine
After taking part in a protest against the 2022 Russian invasion of Ukraine on 24 February 2022, Skochilenko was fined 10,000 rubles.

On 31 March, Skochilenko was arrested for "putting fragments of paper in place of price tags, containing information about the use of the Russian armed forces" in a Perekrestok supermarket. The messages attributed to her included information about Mariupol theatre airstrike on 16 March: "The Russian army bombed an art school in Mariupol where about 400 people were hiding from the shelling." Skochilenko was jailed for eight weeks pending trial, accused of being motivated by "political hatred for Russia". Under the recently introduced Russian fake news laws, she faces a sentence of up to 10 years imprisonment if found guilty. In a letter from her jail in April 2022, Skochilenko wrote: "It just so happened that I represent everything that the Putin regime is so intolerant of: creativity, pacifism, LGBT, psycho-enlightenment, feminism, humanism and love for everything bright, ambiguous, unusual." On 30 May, the St. Petersburg District Court extended her pre-trial detention until July in a closed hearing. In early June, she was temporarily transferred to a psychiatric hospital, where staff refused to treat her for abdomen pain she was experiencing and refused to share information about her condition with her lawyer and partner. On 30 June, the Russian Ministry of Internal Affairs's Centre for Combating Extremism issued a report alleging that Skochilenko was a member of the Eighth Initiative Group, which it deemed a "radical protest feminist group". Skochilenko denied knowledge of the group. Following those claims, the court extended her pre-trial detention until September.

Human rights groups raised concerns about the conditions of her detention, as she suffers from celiac disease, which requires a gluten-free diet that she has not consistently been allowed access to, and which has caused her significant weight loss and health concerns during her detention. As well, her partner has been denied permission to visit her while she had been under detention. In a July interview with Radio Free Europe/Radio Liberty, Skochilenko further raised concerns about possible mistreatment, saying that she and the other prisoners in her cell had been forced to completely clean the cell three times a day by hand and the television in the cell was restricted to war films and pro-government news about the invasion.

She was honored as one of the BBC's 100 Women in 2022.

References

1990 births
Living people
21st-century Russian women artists
21st-century Russian women musicians
Russian activists against the 2022 Russian invasion of Ukraine
Russian feminists
Pacifists
Lesbian painters
Saint Petersburg State University alumni
Painters from Saint Petersburg
Russian women activists
Russian anti-war activists
21st-century Russian painters
Russian lesbian artists
Russian lesbian musicians
Russian LGBT painters
Russian women painters
Russian political prisoners
Russian dissidents
BBC 100 Women